Quarterly West is an American literary magazine based at the University of Utah in Salt Lake City.  Stories that have appeared in Quarterly West have been shortlisted for the Pushcart Prize, The Best American Short Stories and the O. Henry Prize. 
The journal was founded by James Thomas in 1976.

In 2011, Quarterly West became an  exclusively online literary journal.

Notable contributors

Micheal Andreasen
Rebecca Aronson
James Carlos Blake
Jackson Bliss
Fleda Brown
Raymond Carver
Susann Cokal
Annie Dillard
Stephen Dunn
Stuart Dybek
Carolyn Forché
Allen Ginsberg
Albert Goldbarth
Mark Jarman
Philip Levine
Maya Pindyck
Sherod Santos
George Saunders
Sam Shepard 
Eleanor Wilneróand
Antoine Wilson

Masthead
Editor-in-Chief: J.P. Grasser
Managing Editor: Joe Sacksteder
Assistant Editor: Jacqueline Balderrama 
Fiction Editors: Jason Daniels (Senior), Michelle Donahue
Poetry Editors: Cori A. Winrock (Senior), Alen Hamza
Nonfiction Editors: Noam Dorr (Senior), Jace Brittain
New Media Editor: Joe Sacksteder
Reviews Editor: Jessica Rae Bergamino

See also
List of literary magazines

Notes

External links
Quarterly West Homepage

1976 establishments in Utah
2011 disestablishments in Utah
American literature websites
Defunct literary magazines published in the United States
Magazines established in 1976
Magazines disestablished in 2011
Magazines published in Utah
Mass media in Salt Lake City
Online literary magazines published in the United States
Online magazines with defunct print editions
Quarterly magazines published in the United States
Quarterly West